Gonzalo Manuel Soto (born 3 April 1990) is an Argentine footballer who plays as a centre-back for Malaysia Super League club Sarawak United.

Career

AC Bellinzona
In September 2019, Soto joined AC Bellinzona in the Swiss Promotion League.

References

External links
 Profile at Goal
 

1990 births
Living people
Argentine footballers
Argentine expatriate footballers
Argentina international footballers
Club de Gimnasia y Esgrima La Plata footballers
Club Atlético Villa San Carlos footballers
Club Universitario de Deportes footballers
PKNS F.C. players
C.D. Técnico Universitario footballers
Chacarita Juniors footballers
AC Bellinzona players
Argentine Primera División players
Primera Nacional players
Malaysia Super League players
Ecuadorian Serie A players
Swiss Promotion League players
Association football defenders
Footballers from La Plata
Argentine football managers
Argentine expatriate sportspeople in Peru
Argentine expatriate sportspeople in Malaysia
Argentine expatriate sportspeople in Ecuador
Argentine expatriate sportspeople in Switzerland
Expatriate footballers in Peru
Expatriate footballers in Malaysia
Expatriate footballers in Ecuador
Expatriate footballers in Switzerland